Bogdan Rangelov (Serbian Cyrillic: Богдан Рангелов; born 28 August 1997) is a Serbian professional footballer who plays as an attacking midfielder for German club 1. FC Lokomotive Leipzig.

Club career

PAOK
On 1 July 2016, it was announced that Rangelov signed a long year season contract with Aiginiakos, on loan from PAOK.

SV Babelsberg 03
On 29 January 2019, Rangelov joined German club SV Babelsberg 03 on a contract until the end of the season.

1. FC Lokomotive Leipzig
In April 2021, Rangelov signed a two-year contract with 1. FC Lokomotive Leipzig. He made his debut on 24 July, the opening day of the 2021–22 Regionalliga, in a 4–1 loss to BFC Dynamo. On 28 August, he scored his first goal for the club, opening the score in a 3–1 away victory over VSG Altglienicke.

References

External links

1997 births
Living people
Serbian footballers
Serbia youth international footballers
Super League Greece players
Regionalliga players
PAOK FC players
Doxa Drama F.C. players
A.E. Karaiskakis F.C. players
SV Babelsberg 03 players
1. FC Lokomotive Leipzig players
Serbian expatriate footballers
Serbian expatriate sportspeople in Greece
Expatriate footballers in Greece
Serbian expatriate sportspeople in Germany
Expatriate footballers in Germany
Sportspeople from Niš
Association football midfielders